Xinzhou is one of 13 urban districts of the prefecture-level city of Wuhan, the capital of Hubei Province, China, covering part of the city's northeastern suburbs and situated on the northern (left) bank of the Yangtze River. It is also the easternmost of Wuhan's districts. It borders the districts of Hongshan to the southwest and Huangpi to the west, as well as the prefecture-level cities of Huanggang to the north and east and Ezhou to the south.

The Wuhan Yangluo Airfield is located in Xinzhou District.

History
In early July 2019, there were protests against plans for a new incinerator in Yangluo Subdistrict.

Geography

Administrative divisions

Xinzhou District administers:

Climate

Transport
Xinzhou District is served by Yangluo Line (Line 21) of Wuhan Metro.

References

County-level divisions of Hubei
Geography of Wuhan